For All I Am is an American metalcore band from Chicago, Illinois, originally known as “I, Artificial”. The band was formed in 2011. They are currently independent. They released an EP called "Lone Wolf" in 2011. Their debut LP "Skinwalker" was released on January 22, 2013 and their album "No Home" was released on October 14, 2014. For All I Am was named as one of the "100 bands you need to know in 2012" by Alternative Press and has been featured in Rock Sound, Outburn, Hails & Horns, AMP, Substream Music Press magazines and more.

History

After a local show in December 2010 at Rainbow Falls Waterpark in Elk Grove Village, Illinois; vocalist Aria Yavarinejad decided that he was not happy with the way the band was progressing musically and left the band Catastrophe Beneath The Heavens. He formed a new band, I, Artificial, with former bandmates Chase Wagster, Mario Roche, Noah Whitney, and Aaron Martinez.

With a second guitarist, Tom Crisp, on their team, the band changed their name to For All I Am and signed to Equal Vision Records

The band released their first EP, Lone Wolf, on November 1, 2011. 

The band went on their first tour, "Take A Picture, It Will Last Longer" on November 22, 2011 with bands We Came As Romans, Sleeping with Sirens, and Attila. Emmure played on select dates.

The band premiered their new single, "Swallowed Alive" on October 21, 2013.

On January 22, 2013, the band released the first full-length album under Equal Vision Records. It was recorded with producer Will Putney (Chiodos, For Today, Like Moths to Flames) at the Machine Shop Studios in Belleville, New Jersey. The album title comes from the term “skin-walker”, which references a person with the ability to transform into any animal supernaturally.

In 2013, the band parted ways with guitarist Chase Wagster and Jesse Marx filled the role as lead guitarist.

For All I Am embarked on their first heading tour in 2014, "Thawed Out", with bands Cursed Sails, Chasing Safety, Youth In Revolt and Separations.

The band signed to InVogue Records and announced their second full-length recording, "No Home" to be released on October 22, 2014.

In October 2014, the band released a music video for the song "Young Grave".

On June 18, 2017, it was announced on the band's Facebook that Tom Crisp and Aaron Martinez have departed from the band. Aria issued a statement regarding the changes and his continued interest in pursuing the band.

After an almost 3 year hiatus, the band released a new single titled "This Is Not What I Thought" on April 24th, 2020. Clayton Neeley joins as their new guitarist.

Band members

Current members
 Aria Yavarinejad – lead vocals, backing vocals (2011–present)
 Mario Roche – Bass (2011-2015, 2019-present)
 Clayton Neeley – guitars (2019-present)

Former members
 Jesse Marx – lead guitar (2013-2015)
 Aaron Martinez – drums (2011–2017)
 Tom Crisp – Lead guitar (2011–2017)
 Chase Wagster - Guitar <small>(2011 - 2013 / 2019 - 2020)

Discography
Studio albums

EPs
 Lone Wolf (2011)

Singles
 This Is Not What I Thought (2020)
 Letting Go (2021)

References

External links 
Facebook page
Website

Metalcore musical groups from Illinois
Musical groups established in 2010
Musical quintets
2010 establishments in Illinois
Equal Vision Records artists